John Hendrick may refer to:
 John Hendrick (American football), American college football coach and former professional player
 John Kerr Hendrick, member of the U.S. House of Representatives from Kentucky